The Little Orphan is a 1949 American one-reel animated cartoon and the 40th Tom and Jerry cartoon, released in theaters on April 30, 1949 by Metro-Goldwyn Mayer. It was produced by Fred Quimby and directed by William Hanna and Joseph Barbera, with music by Scott Bradley. The cartoon was animated by Irven Spence, Kenneth Muse, Ed Barge and Ray Patterson. The short features Nibbles, a young mouse who is insatiably hungry.

The Little Orphan won the 1948 Academy Award for Best Short Subject: Cartoons, the fifth Oscar (of seven) given to Tom and Jerry. Though the cartoon was released in 1949, it won its Oscar the previous year, tying them with Disney's Silly Symphonies with the record of the most Oscars.

Plot
Jerry is sitting in a mouse-sized chaise longue reading Good Mousekeeping and eating cheese, which he is pulling off a mousetrap that has been set just in front of his mousehole. When his doorbell rings, he opens the door but does not see anyone; Nibbles zips through the door under his nose. Jerry shrugs in confusion, but then turns to see Nibbles pulling on the cheese in the mousetrap. He whisks him away just before it springs. Jerry then finds a note pinned to Nibbles' red scarf (which matches his cap, both trimmed with white fur). Nibbles is the orphan whom Jerry had agreed to host for Thanksgiving. A postscript on the note warns: "He's always hungry".

Jerry's cupboards are empty, so he carefully leads Nibbles to a big bowl of milk in front of where Tom is sleeping peacefully. Jerry warns him to be very quiet, and holds him over the bowl. Nibbles takes a nice loud slurp, awaking Tom just as Jerry pulls Nibbles back into hiding. Tom does not see anyone, so he slurps his milk and goes back to sleep. Jerry holds Nibbles out to catch the last big drop that falls from Tom's whisker, but the bowl is now empty.

Then Nibbles sees Mammy Two Shoes place a large turkey on the already laden table. Jerry climbs up to the table, and drops a long piece of spaghetti, which Nibbles slurps his way up. Nibbles begins to eat three bites of all kinds of food (and a candle), but Jerry again saves him from disaster when, bouncing off a gelatin or Jello, he almost lands in piping hot soup. Jerry takes decorations from the table and dresses himself as a pilgrim with a hat and blunderbuss, and Nibbles follows his example. Nibbles then takes a whole orange in his mouth, swelling his head, but Jerry hits Nibbles on the back of the head, causing the orange to fly out of Nibbles, and into a sleeping Tom's mouth, then rebounding back and forth in his guts, thoroughly waking him up.

Tom, seeing the mice getting into the Thanksgiving dinner, puts on a feather duster, first as a general camouflage, but then as a Native American headdress. Tom approaches Nibbles, who points his toy blunderbuss at Tom. Tom lowers his chin, knowing this will not hurt him. What really comes knocking the feline out of his bliss is Jerry popping a champagne cork, which hurls into his face. Tom then grabs Jerry, but Nibbles, purposefully this time and carrying a fork, ricochets off the jello and stabs Tom in the hind end. Tom howls in pain and then uses the fork to catch Nibbles, and Jerry, perched on a candelabra, whacks Tom in the face with a large spoon, knocking him back.

Sneaking back to the table, Tom sets a bowl of cattails on fire one at a time, throwing them like spears. The cattails burn or melt the various hiding places Jerry and Nibbles find. With the third one, Jerry lifts a hemispherical lid and the cattail reverses back toward Tom. Then Tom throws a knife into the turkey and Jerry runs into the blunt edge, at his throat, and falls unconscious.

Nibbles now launches an all-out attack: he bends back a knife handle to launch a pie; using the string between the turkey legs he slingshots a candle (though Tom does not feel any pain) ; and after cutting a cork off a champagne bottle, it begins to rocket at Tom, ultimately making Tom and the room into a terrible mess. A white surrender flag comes up from the pile of dishes Tom has fallen under.

Finally, all three, with Tom bandaged, and order on the table restored, sit down to dinner. All bow their heads while Jerry says grace. But just as Tom and Jerry pick up their cutlery, Nibbles goes through the entire turkey like a buzz saw, leaving the famished cat and mouse with nothing to eat but the bones that have clattered to the plate. Nibbles, now finally full, pats his huge stomach in delight.

Production
As per every short of Tom and Jerry during its first two decades, The Little Orphan was directed by William Hanna and Joseph Barbera, with its score composed by Scott Bradley. The short is produced by Fred Quimby and animated by Irven Spence, Kenneth Muse, Ed Barge, Ray Patterson, with layouts done by Richard Bickenbach.

The cartoon was remade in CinemaScope using thicker lines and more stylised backgrounds as Feedin' the Kiddie.

Reception
Ben Simon of Animated Views considered the short as "a great example of a cat and mouse cartoon working well on all levels". For writer and historian Michael Samerdyke, The Little Orphan is "[o]ne of the most fondly remembered" Tom and Jerry cartoons, noting that the short "added some priceless images" to the cartoon series. He surmised that the short "unlocked something in Hanna and Barbera's imaginations. In the Fifties, instead of having their characters pretend they were in a different historical era, they would place the rivalry of Tom & Jerry in other times and places."

Animation historian Michael Barrier saw the character of Nibbles in The Little Orphan as an example of the growing sentimentality seen in Tom and Jerry in the late 1940s, as manifested in the character's "formulaic adorability".

Home media
"Tom and Jerry's Greatest Chases, Vol. 1" (2000)
"Tom and Jerry Spotlight Collection" (2004)
"Warner Bros. Home Entertainment Academy Awards Animation Collection: 15 Winners" (2008)
"Warner Bros. Home Entertainment Academy Awards Animation Collection" (2008)
"Tom and Jerry: The Deluxe Anniversary Collection" (2010)

References

External links

1949 films
1940s American animated films
1940s animated short films
1949 comedy films
1949 short films
1949 animated films
Animated films about orphans
Animated films without speech
Best Animated Short Academy Award winners
Films scored by Scott Bradley
Metro-Goldwyn-Mayer animated short films
Short films directed by Joseph Barbera
Short films directed by William Hanna
Thanksgiving in films
Tom and Jerry short films
American comedy short films
Films produced by Fred Quimby
Metro-Goldwyn-Mayer cartoon studio short films